This list of museums in Merseyside, England contains museums which are defined for this context as institutions (including nonprofit organizations, government entities, and private businesses) that collect and care for objects of cultural, artistic, scientific, or historical interest and make their collections or related exhibits available for public viewing. Also included are non-profit art galleries and university art galleries.  Museums that exist only in cyberspace (i.e., virtual museums) are not included.

Museums

Defunct museums
  Bootle Free Library and Museum, collections now part of The Atkinson
 Cavern Mecca, closed in 1984
 Botanic Gardens Museum, collections now part of The Atkinson
 HM Customs & Excise National Museum, Liverpool, collections now a gallery in the Merseyside Maritime Museum
 King's Regiment (Liverpool) Museum, Liverpool, formerly part of the Museum of Liverpool Life, closed in 2006, will reopen as a gallery in the Museum of Liverpool
 Liverpool Scottish Regimental Museum, Liverpool, artifacts now in storage
 Museum of Liverpool Life, Liverpool, closed in 2006, collections moved to the Museum of Liverpool
 National Conservation Centre, Liverpool, closed to the public in 2010
 Shore Road Pumping Station, Birkenhead
 Steamport Southport, Southport, also known as Southport Railway Museum, closed in 1999, collections now part of the Ribble Steam Railway
 Warship Preservation Trust, Birkenhead, closed in 2006 
 Wirral Museum, Birkenhead

See also
 :Category:Tourist attractions in Merseyside

References

 Visit Liverpool

 
Merseyside
Museums